Darwen was a county constituency in Lancashire, centred on the town of Darwen. It returned one Member of Parliament to the House of Commons of the Parliament of the United Kingdom from 1885 until it was abolished for the 1983 general election.

During the 1920s, the constituency was a fiercely contested marginal between the Liberal and Conservative Parties, with the sitting MP defeated at each election. At the 1924 general election, it saw a 92.7% turnout, a record for an English constituency. Following the defeat of Liberal leader Sir Herbert Samuel in 1935, the seat became a safe Conservative seat for the remainder of its existence.

It was largely replaced by the new Rossendale & Darwen constituency.

Boundaries 
1885–1918: The Boroughs of Over Darwen and Blackburn, the Sessional Divisions of Darwen and Walton-le-Dale, and parts of the Sessional Divisions of Blackburn and Clitheroe.

1918–1950: The Borough of Darwen, the Urban District of Turton, and the Rural District of Blackburn.

1950–1955: The Borough of Darwen, the Urban Districts of Turton and Withnell, and the Rural District of Blackburn. Withnell Urban District was added from the pre-1950 Chorley constituency.

1955–1983: The St. Andrew's, St. Francis's and St. Mark's wards of the County Borough of Blackburn, the Borough of Darwen, the Urban District of Turton, and the Rural District of Blackburn.

Members of Parliament

Election results

Elections in the 1880s

Elections in the 1890s

Elections in the 1900s

Elections in the 1910s 

General Election 1914–15:

Another General Election was required to take place before the end of 1915. The political parties had been making preparations for an election to take place and by the July 1914, the following candidates had been selected; 
Unionist: John Rutherford
Liberal: Frederick Hindle

Elections in the 1920s

Elections in the 1930s

Elections in the 1940s 
A General election was due to take place before the end of 1940, but was postponed due to the Second World War. By 1939, the following candidates had been selected to contest this constituency;
Conservative:  Stuart Russell
Liberal: Phillip Rea
Labour: Ronald Haines

Elections in the 1950s

Elections in the 1960s

Elections in the 1970s

See also 
1943 Darwen by-election

References 

Parliamentary constituencies in North West England (historic)
Constituencies of the Parliament of the United Kingdom established in 1885
Politics of Blackburn with Darwen
Darwen